Juan Carlos Ferreyra (born 12 September 1983 in San Rafael) is an Argentine football striker currently playing for Rincón del Atuel. He is nicknamed el Tanque (the Tank) because of his height.

Career 
He began his career in the lower leagues of Argentine football where he played for clubs such as Independiente Rivadavia Yupanqui and Almirante Brown. Because of his success he was transferred to Gimnasia de La Plata. He has also played for Deportivo Cali in Colombia and Deportivo Cuenca in Ecuador.

The Newell's Old Boys forward will play on loan for O'Higgins, until the end of the season.

Ferreyra will play in Club Olimpia from Paraguay in the second half of the 2010 season. He has already scored 2 goals in 2 friendly matches played in Chile (both were against Colo Colo). The "Tank's" official debut in Club Olimpia is giving hope to all those fans of Olimpia who has last won the Paraguayan Cup in the year 2000. He recently signed a contract with club Universitario for a 3-year deal.
Ahora ya en Barcelona S.C. 2012.
In 2013, he was vice-champion at Libertadores with Olimpia (PAR). In 2014, he signed with Botafogo, from Brazil.

References

External links 
 Argentine Primera statistics at Fútbol XXI  

1983 births
Living people
Sportspeople from Mendoza Province
Argentine footballers
Argentine expatriate footballers
Independiente Rivadavia footballers
Newell's Old Boys footballers
C.D. Cuenca footballers
Deportivo Cali footballers
O'Higgins F.C. footballers
Unión Española footballers
Club Olimpia footballers
All Boys footballers
Barcelona S.C. footballers
C.S.D. Macará footballers
Botafogo de Futebol e Regatas players
Chilean Primera División players
Argentine Primera División players
Torneo Federal A players
Torneo Argentino A players
Campeonato Brasileiro Série A players
Categoría Primera A players
Ecuadorian Serie A players
Paraguayan Primera División players
Argentine expatriate sportspeople in Chile
Expatriate footballers in Brazil
Expatriate footballers in Chile
Expatriate footballers in Colombia
Expatriate footballers in Ecuador
Expatriate footballers in Paraguay
Association football forwards